Thomas Warren Newcome II (August 18, 1923 – February 7, 2011) was an American lawyer and politician.

Newcome was born in Saint Paul, Minnesota and graduated from Saint Thomas Academy in Mendota Heights, Minnesota. He served in the United States Army during World War II and the Korean War. Newcome graduated from University of Minnesota and St. Paul College of Law (now William Mitchell College of Law). He lived in White Bear Lake, Minnesota with his wife and family and practiced law. Newcome served as Mayor of White Bear Lake from 1961 to 1963 and on the Mahtomedi, Minnesota School Board. He also served as White Bear Lake Municipal Court judge and city attorney. Newcome served in the Minnesota House of Representatives from 1965 to 1974. He died at his home in White Bear Lake, Minnesota.

References

1923 births
2011 deaths
Politicians from Saint Paul, Minnesota
People from White Bear Lake, Minnesota
Military personnel from Minnesota
Minnesota lawyers
University of Minnesota alumni
William Mitchell College of Law alumni
School board members in Minnesota
Mayors of places in Minnesota
Members of the Minnesota House of Representatives